Maccabi Ironi Netivot is an Israeli football club based in Netivot. The club is currently in Liga Bet South B division.

History
The club was founded in 2002, after the previous football club of the city, Hapoel Netivot, which have played in Liga Gimel South division, up until the 2000–01 season, was dissolved, following eight matches suspension due to crowd trouble.

Maccabi Ironi Netivot won Liga Gimel South division in the 2003–04 season and were promoted to Liga Bet, and in the 2006–07 season, they won Liga Bet South B division, and were promoted to Liga Alef.

In the 2008–09 season, which was the last season of Liga Alef as the fourth tier of Israeli football, as Liga Artzit was scrapped, the club was close to achieve promotion to Liga Leumit, the second tier or Israeli football. however, they finished runners-up in Liga Alef South, two points behind champions, Maccabi Be'er Sheva, and remained in Liga Alef. the club played in Liga Alef until the 2011–12 season, when they finished second bottom, and relegated to Liga Bet, following a defeat of 0-1 to Hapoel Azor in the Relegation play-offs.

Honours
Liga Bet South B:
2006–07
Liga Gimel South:
2003–04

External links
Maccabi Ironi Netivot The Israel Football Association

References

Ironi Netivot
Ironi Netivot
Association football clubs established in 2002
2002 establishments in Israel